Blà Bheinn or Blàbheinn, also known as Blaven, is a mountain on the Isle of Skye in Scotland. It is usually regarded as an outlier of the Black Cuillin range. North of the summit is the ridge of Clach Glas, which leads to the peaks of Garbh-bheinn (808 m) and Sgùrr nan Each (720 m). It is mainly composed of gabbro, a rock with excellent grip for mountaineers and scramblers. 

The name  is thought to mean "blue mountain", from a combination of Norse and Gaelic. Whereas  in Modern Norwegian means "blue", the Old Norse word  could, however, also refer to the colours blue-black and black.

The normal route of ascent for walkers is from the east. A path leaves the B8083 on the shores of Loch Slapin about 4 km after the village of Torrin. The path follows a burn, the Allt na Dunachie, into the corrie of Coire Uaigneich. From here a short steep route along the ridge leads to the summit. A small amount of scrambling is needed to reach the true top of the mountain. Alternative routes follow the south ridge, or come from the north having traversed the Clach Glas ridge which links to the Red Cuillin peaks.

Blaven stands in the Strathaird Estate, owned and managed since 1994 by the John Muir Trust.

In popular culture 
Blaven is depicted in Mary Stewart's 1956 thriller novel Wildfire at Midnight.

References

External links
 Blaven.com
 John Muir Trust

Munros
Marilyns of Scotland
Mountains and hills of Highland (council area)
Mountains and hills of the Isle of Skye